The Audience Engine is announced open-source, customizable suite of fundraising tools for public radio being developed by the Congera Corporation, a subsidiary of WFMU Radio. It was conceived by and is being developed under the supervision of WFMU management, but as of November 2020 no product has been announced, demoed or released thus rendering the project as effectively vaporware.

The platform is based on WFMU's own model of fundraising and listener-community relations, a project that began development in 1998 and WFMU claims helps raise 70% of its annual $2.5 million operating budget via its website. The developers explain that "by pairing online content, real-time playlist information, social media, and community interaction tools directly with crowdfunding campaigns, WFMU has not only built a positive and intelligent online community, but also a sustainable model that can be adopted by other organizations." Besides radio, Audience Engine has potential usage for online television and journalism. The goal is to "enable organizations ... to build audiences and become self sufficient."

A large part of Audience Engine's potential appeal is its tightly integrated fundraising capabilities. "Audience Engine comes with a set of tools that integrates crowdfunding-inspired donation tools throughout a publisher's site, with on and off-site widgets for donations as well as gift reward management, and a full suite of analytics underlying it all for that publisher to gain insight on what is and isn't raising money," noted Flanagan. Freedman observed that "Kickstarter did a great job of borrowing or stealing the concept of the pledge drive, and vastly improved it as well. Public media hasn't borrowed it back yet! That's what we're trying to do."

Although aimed primarily towards small and mid-sized radio stations, larger public radio stations such as WBUR and WNYC have considered harnessing the platform's possible uses in their operations.

A draft of the platform was publicly debuted at a launch event held on November 5, 2015.

Platform

The platform is supposedly being built in modular APIs that utilize JavaScript and XML feeds, but will include modules that integrate into Drupal, which is used by many small news organizations.

Part of the Audience Engine's philosophy is to retain the listener's or reader's attention on the station website, rather than redirect them to external social media. "Community based radio stations have to start thinking about online platforms that don’t effectively abandon discussion and networking to Twitter, Facebook, Reddit, or LinkedIn, and the rest of the usual suspects," said Matthew Lasar at Radio Survivor. "[O]nce your listeners and/or website readers are off to Twitter/Facebook-land, they’re all but gone. They’re not commenting on your podcast or stream or blog post in your house. They’re far far away, helping Mark Zuckerberg bring in that advertisement and audience data cash." 

Radio World described the mocked up Audience Engine dashboard as featuring "a responsively designed social content page for radio and news sites, engineered for live, positive audience feedback and created with self-sustaining crowdfunding in mind. Both Web and mobile pages have a built-in, interactive second screen, with incentives for positive contributions, and tools for stopping disruptive behavior."

The project’s proposed first module, a crowdfunding app called Mynte, was scheduled to launch in 2018 but nothing has appeared as of November 2020.

Besides WFMU, potential early adopters of Audience Engine include WWOZ-FM, a New Orleans-based jazz and blues station; WSOU-FM (Seton Hall University), and WPRB-FM (Princeton University).

Development team

Early development of Audience Engine was undertaken by Bocoup, a developer of open-source web technologies which has collaborated with Google, Microsoft, Walmart, eBay, and Apple. Bocoup's involvement ended in January 2016, and the project was turned over to a team of independent developers under the supervision of WFMU.

WordPress developers Joey Dehnert and Andrew Nealon at InsertCulture, a now defunct development firm, have helped develop the foundation of Audience Engine’s web platform.

The Audience Engine project has received $500,000 in grant money over several years from the Geraldine R. Dodge Foundation to undertake development of the software.

As of March 2021, WFMU remains the sole user of Audience Engine, as development has gone "much slower than expected" and due to the fact that it remains incomplete, despite its original target release date of 2020.

Spinitron

In 2016, Audience Engine's parent company Congera merged with Boston-based Spinitron LLC, a music tracking software, for SoundExchange, airplay playlist, and other copyright-compliance reporting, company.

References

External links
Official Website

Vaporware
Free software
Social information processing
Web development software
Crowdfunding platforms of the United States
Mass media companies of the United States